The Saskatchewan Junior Hockey League is a Junior 'A' ice hockey league operating in the Canadian province of Saskatchewan and one of nine member leagues of the Canadian Junior Hockey League.  

Open to North American-born players 20 years of age or younger, the SJHL's 12 teams play in three divisions: the Olympic Buildings, Sherwood and Viterra Divisions. A major attraction in Saskatchewan, the SJHL draws 400,000 fans each season. The winner of the SJHL playoffs is crowned the provincial Junior A champion and continues on to play in the ANAVET Cup against the Manitoba provincial champion (winner of the Manitoba Junior Hockey League playoffs) for the right to represent the Western region at the Centennial Cup, the national Junior A championship.

History

The current version of the SJHL was preceded by a separate league with the same name that operated from 1948 to 1966. 

The modern SJHL was formed in July 1968 as a result of the Western Canada Hockey League (WCHL) splitting away from the Canadian Amateur Hockey Association (CAHA) and affiliating with the rival Canadian Hockey Association led by Ron Butlin. CAHA president Lloyd Pollock arranged meetings across Western Canada to outline the CAHA's development plan for teams which had remained within the CAHA. Later that month, he approved a series of exhibition games for teams in the Ontario Hockey Association to play the Regina Pats and Weyburn Red Wings, after Regina and Weyburn had asked for assistance in forming a new Saskatchewan Junior Hockey League. Pollock also laid out plans to make player transfers easier between provinces to support the Saskatchewan teams.

The league was originally known as the Saskatchewan Amateur Junior Hockey League until 1973.  They re-adopted the "Amateur" in their name in 1980 and carried it until the 1987–88 season, when they dropped the "Amateur" again.  They were one of the original Tier II Junior A leagues in the realignment of 1970. Their first two seasons they were eligible for the Memorial Cup.

Humboldt Broncos bus crash

On April 6, 2018 the Humboldt Broncos team bus suffered a fatal crash on their way to the team's semi-final playoff game against the Nipawin Hawks. Ten players, two coaches, an athletic therapist, two employees of a local radio station, and the bus driver were killed in the collision. The remaining passengers were injured, some critically. The SJHL playoffs were postponed as a result (the Hawks were leading the series 3–1). The league, at the request of the Broncos, resumed the playoffs on April 15, with the Hawks advancing to the finals to meet the waiting Estevan Bruins. SJHL President Bill Chow called the incident the league's "worst nightmare".

In the wake of the Humboldt Broncos bus crash, TSN aired a national broadcast of the Bronco's 2018–19 home opener, the team's first regular season game following the tragedy.

Impact of the COVID-19 pandemic 

On March 13, 2020, pursuant to the suspension of all sanctioned activity by Hockey Canada and the CJHL due to the COVID-19 pandemic, the remainder of the 2019–20 SJHL season and all associated championships were suspended until further notice. The league championship was not awarded.

The league resumed play for a 2020–21 season in November 2020, with the Saskatchewan Health Authority (SHA) allowing for limited in-person attendance (150 spectators). However, the Flin Flon Bombers were forced to suspend operations on November 12, 2020 until at least the new year, after Manitoba issued a "Code Red" circuit breaker that ordered the closure of non-essential businesses and recreational facilities. The team considered the possibility of conducting all hockey operations out of nearby Creighton, Saskatchewan, but were unable to reach agreements with the SHA and Manitoba Health that would allow them to resume operations. In turn, the SJHL was forced to suspend play on November 27, as Saskatchewan ordered the suspension of all group and team sports activities.

In February 2021, the league submitted a return-to-play proposal to the Saskatchewan government that would have involved as many as three hub cities. Despite other provinces such as Alberta having allowed their Junior A leagues to continue, Saskatchewan continued to maintain its prohibitions on sport. The SJHL and its teams have faced growing financial issues due to cancelled games and other events, prompting the provincial government to provide a $1 million relief package to be divided between its teams. On March 23, 2021, the SJHL announced that its return-to-play proposal had been rejected, citing concerns surrounding the current state of the pandemic in Saskatchewan. The SJHL therefore announced that the 2020–21 season had been cancelled and will not be resumed. The league championship was not awarded for the second season in a row.

Media 
In January 2019, the league announced a broadcasting deal with SaskTel, under which a game will be carried on its television service per-month for the remainder of the season, as well as coverage of the league final.

Teams

Current
The SJHL currently fields twelve teams, eleven located in the province of Saskatchewan and one in Flin Flon, Manitoba, a community located on the border between the provinces.  A team based in Lloydminster, Saskatchewan (on the Saskatchewan-Alberta border) elects to play in the Alberta Junior Hockey League.

Former

League champions

Timeline of teams in the SJHL
1968 – Current version of the Saskatchewan Junior Hockey League is founded
1968 – Moose Jaw Canucks, Weyburn Red Wings and Regina Pats rejoin league from WCJHL
1970 – Regina Pat Blues replace Regina Pats who join WCHL
1970 – Melville Millionaires rejoin league
1970 – Humboldt Broncos join league
1970 – Notre Dame Hounds join league
1971 – Estevan Bruins rejoin league
1971 – Prince Albert Raiders join league
1972 – Yorkton Terriers join league
1973 – Battleford Barons join league
1974 – Swift Current Broncos join league
1976 – Notre Dame Hounds leave league
1982 – Prince Albert Raiders leave league to join Western Hockey League
1982 – Lloydminster Lancers join league
1982 – Regina Pat Blues and Saskatoon J's fold
1983 – Swift Current Broncos become Swift Current Indians
1983 – Battleford Barons become North Battleford Stars
1984 – Moose Jaw Canucks fold to make way for the Western Hockey League franchise Moose Jaw Warriors
1984 – Flin Flon Bombers rejoin league as Creighton Bombers
1986 – Swift Current Indians fold to make way for the Western Hockey League franchise Swift Current Broncos
1986 – Creighton Bombers become the Flin Flon Bombers
1986 – Nipawin Hawks join league
1987 – Notre Dame Hounds rejoin league
1987 – Minot Americans join league
1988 – Lloydminster Lancers leave league to join Alberta Junior Hockey League and become the Lloydminster Blazers
1988 – Melfort Mustangs join league
1991 – Saskatoon Titans join league
1993 – Saskatoon Titans relocate to Kindersley and become the Kindersley Klippers
1993 – Lebret Eagles join league
1994 – Minot Americans become Minot Top Guns
1997 – Minot Top Guns relocate to Beardy's 97 aboriginal reserve and become Beardy's Rage
1998 – Beardy's Rage relocate to Saskatoon and become Saskatoon Rage
1998 – La Ronge Ice Wolves join league
1999 – Saskatoon Rage fold
2001 – Lebret Eagles fold

See also
List of ice hockey leagues
Sport in Saskatchewan#Team sports

References

External links

SJHL Forum

 
Canadian Junior Hockey League members
A Saskatchewan
Hockey Saskatchewan